The Black Stone is a Muslim object of reverence.

Black Stone may also refer to:

 "The Black Stone", a 1931 short story by Robert E. Howard 
 "Black Stone: Magic & Steel", a 2003 role-playing video game
 "Black Stone" (song), a 2005 pop song
 "Black Stone" (film), a 2015 South Korean—French film about an army deserter, starring Won Tae-hee
 Black Stone, Jablanica, the highest peak of Jablanica Mountain
 Al-Hajar al-Aswad, a city in Syria
 Black mecca, a place in the United States such as Atlanta or Harlem, to which African Americans are attracted
 Lapis Niger, an ancient shrine in the Roman Forum
 Black stone is another name for Snake-stones, an African traditional remedy against snakebite.

See also
 Black Rock (disambiguation)
 Blackstone (disambiguation)
 Blackstones (disambiguation)